The Bakersfield Oilers was a semi-pro hockey team in the Pacific Southwest Hockey League that played in Bakersfield, California in 1994-95.  The Oilers played out of the 4,100 seat Bakersfield Convention Center.  The Oilers were the predecessor to the Bakersfield Fog of the West Coast Hockey League.  They made the transition along with the Alaska Gold Kings (Fairbanks, Alaska), Anchorage Aces (Anchorage, Alaska), and Fresno Falcons (Fresno, California) to a minor professional league in 1995-96.  The players had college, major junior, junior A and minor pro experience. Many of the players spent their off season playing roller hockey Roller Hockey International and were living in southern California.

Players
 #1 - Matt Even
 #2 - Jeff Furlong 
 #3 - Gerald Glass
 #6 - Steve Ross
 #7 - Jim Cashman 
 #9 - Tom Imperato
 #10 - Alex Austin
 #11 - Todd Nelson
 #12 - Simon Bibeau
 #14 - Russ Franklin (Assistant Captain)
 #15 - Scott Zwygart
 #17 - Mike Callahan (Captain)
 #18 - Bill Miller
 #19 - Dean Wilson
 #20 - Barry Sherer (Assistant Captain)
 #23 - Craig Butz
 #24 - Dave Nash
 #25 - Mike McGrath
 #27 - John Redinger
 #28 - Rick Plester
 #32 - Brad Scholl
 #44 - Mike Butters

Defunct ice hockey teams in California
Sports in Bakersfield, California
1994 establishments in California
1995 disestablishments in California
Ice hockey clubs established in 1994
Sports clubs disestablished in 1995